The dwarf warty pleurobranch, Pleurobranchaea tarda, is a species of sea slug, a marine gastropod mollusc in the family Pleurobranchaeidae.

Distribution
This species is found on the Atlantic coast of North America and West Africa, as well as off the South African coast, from the Atlantic coast of the Cape Peninsula to Knysna intertidally to 60 m.

Description
The dwarf warty pleurobranch has an oval sandy-coloured body with a spade-shaped head and two widely separated rolled rhinophores. It has a single gill on the right hand side of its body and can grow to be 70 mm long. It may be confused with the warty pleurobranch, which is bigger and has a rougher surface, but tends to live in shallower water.

Ecology
It is an enthusiastic predator on other opisthobranchs; and has even been seen eating smaller individuals of the same species. Its egg ribbon forms a sizeable roll of several white loops.

References

 Abbott R. T. (1974) American seashells. The marine mollusca of the Atlantic and Pacific coast of North America. ed. 2. Van Nostrand, New York. 663 pp., 24 pls

Pleurobranchaeidae